WERW may refer to:

 WERW (FM), a radio station (94.3 FM) licensed to serve Monroe, Michigan, United States
 WERW (student radio), an unlicensed radio station at Syracuse University